"It's Too Late to Worry" is a song recorded by American country music artist Jo Dee Messina.  It was released in July 2006 as the fourth single from the album Delicious Surprise.  The song reached #33 on the Billboard Hot Country Songs chart.  The song was written by Danny Wells, Ron Harbin and Anthony L. Smith.

Chart performance

References

2006 singles
2005 songs
Jo Dee Messina songs
Songs written by Ron Harbin
Songs written by Anthony L. Smith
Songs written by Danny Wells (songwriter)
Song recordings produced by Mark Bright (record producer)
Curb Records singles